ㅖ (ye) is one of the Korean hangul. The Unicode for ㅖ is U+3156.

Stroke order

Hangul jamo
Vowel letters